Psorya is a monotypic moth genus of the family Erebidae. Its only species, Psorya hadesia, is found on the Galápagos Islands. Both the genus and species were first described by Schaus in 1923.

References

Calpinae
Monotypic moth genera